Dąb is a district of Katowice in southern Poland.

Dąb may also refer to:

Places
 Dąb, Greater Poland Voivodeship, west-central Poland
 Dąb, Lubusz Voivodeship, west Poland
 Dąb, Warmian-Masurian Voivodeship, north Poland

Other uses
 Dąb coat of arms

See also
 DAB (disambiguation)